Movement of Professionals "Hope" (MPSN) was a political party in Moldova led by Vladimir Florea.

History
Registered on 30 April 1997, the party joined the Social Democratic Bloc "Hope" alliance to contest the 1998 elections. However, the alliance received just 1.31% of the vote and failed to win a seat.

Prior to the 2001 elections the party joined the Braghiş Alliance. The Alliance won 19 seats, one of which was taken by the MPSN's Vitalis Mrug.

Following the 2003 local elections, in which the MPSN won just 21 seats and three mayoralties across the country, the party did not contest any further elections.

References

Defunct political parties in Moldova
Political parties established in 1997